The Praxis Discussion Series was established by the World Bank office in Sydney, Australia in order to provide a forum to discuss ideas, approaches, initiatives and policy pertinent to international development. Launched in January 2009 in partnership with Australian public affairs television channel A-PAC, the series aims to stimulate debate and promote the exchange of ideas. A one-hour panel-style program, the show is recorded throughout the year at the World Bank office.

Each session features three specialists on a select topic relating to international development. To coincide with the World Bank's work in the Pacific region, a World Bank representative is usually a part of the panel, joined by two other guest speakers providing different perspectives on the issue at hand.

Recognising a gap in the development conversation, Praxis opened its doors to one and all, allowing the general public to sit alongside representatives from Australian government departments, civil society and non-government organisations, and the private sector, as well as various academics and students, in order to tackle development issues from a variety of perspectives. With the deadline for achieving the Millennium Development Goals coming up in 2015, such discussions are becoming increasingly important. Interactivity is valued above all else, and every audience member has the opportunity to have their say and question the views of the panelists.

Discussions are also broadcast in Fiji, Samoa, Tonga and Papua New Guinea, while the World Bank's YouTube channel provides content online. Further, the involvement of the Global Development Learning Network (GDLN) has meant that audiences in Timor-Leste, Solomon Islands and Papua New Guinea have been able to take part in discussions via video conference.

Past Discussions

Notes

External links
 Praxis Discussion Series
 World Bank: Pacific Islands
 YouTube: World Bank channel
 A-PAC

World Bank